All About Lawrence of Arabia is a 1962 book about T. E. Lawrence, a British officer in World War I. The book written by Alistair MacLean for teenagers. It focuses on Lawrence's exploits as leader of the Arab forces battling in the Arabian desert.

References

External links
Lawrence of Arabia at Kirkus

1962 books